Paraclinus marmoratus, the Marbled blenny, is a species of labrisomid blenny native to the western Atlantic Ocean including the Gulf of Mexico and the Caribbean Sea from southern Florida to Venezuela. It seems to show a particular association with the sponge Verongia fistularis. This species can reach a length of  TL. It can also be found in the aquarium trade.

References

marmoratus
Fish described in 1876
Fish of the Atlantic Ocean